Simri is a village and corresponding community development block in Buxar district of Bihar, India.

As of 2011, the population of Simri was 17,670, in 2,621 households, while the total population of Simri block was 207,225, in 30,388 households.

Demographics 

Simri is a rural block, with no urban centres. Between 2001 and 2011, it experienced the lowest rate of population growth among blocks in Buxar district. As of 2011, the block sex ratio was 909, lower than the district ratio of 922. The sex ratio among the 0-6 age group was higher, at 921, although still somewhat lower than the district ratio of 934. Members of scheduled castes made up 10.86% of block residents, and members of scheduled tribes made up 2.83 (the latter being the highest among blocks in Buxar district). The block's literacy rate was 68.3% (79.53% of men and 55.89% of women), which was slightly lower than the district value of 70.14%.

A majority of Simri block's workforce was engaged in agriculture in 2011, with 22.63% being cultivators who owned or leased their own land and another 48.84% being agricultural labourers who worked someone else's land for wages. 6.93% were household industry workers, and the remaining 21.61%.

Villages 
There are 156 villages in Simri block, 94 of which are inhabited and 62 of which are uninhabited. They are as follows:

References 

Villages in Buxar district